Sir George Harold Lloyd-Jacob (1 October 1897 – 5 December 1969) was a British High Court judge who was notable for his work in patent law. In 1950, he was appointed to the Chancery Division and became the first judge to specialise in patents.

Lloyd-Jacob was born in Wood Green, Middlesex, one of 10 children born to John Lloyd-Jacob and Jane Catherine Park. He was educated at Southgate School, Christ Church, Oxford and King's College, London. In the First World War, he saw service with the Royal Flying Corps and served in the Royal Air Force from 1918–21. He was called to the bar in 1893 and took silk in 1945.

From 1937–45, Lloyd-Jacob served as junior counsel to the Board of Trade on patent matters. He was appointed to the High Court in January 1950 and was knighted by King George VI the next month. In 1967, in a 49-day patent case he was hearing, defendants Rolls-Royce – who were being sued over a dispute over engine patents – insured Lloyd-Jacob's life for £100,000 until the end of the case.

He died unexpectedly in Surrey at age 72.

References

1890s births
1969 deaths
People from Wood Green
People educated at Southgate School
Alumni of Christ Church, Oxford
Alumni of King's College London
Chancery Division judges
Knights Bachelor
Royal Flying Corps personnel
British Army personnel of World War I
Royal Air Force officers
Royal Air Force personnel of World War II